Athirah is a 2016 Indonesian drama film directed by Riri Riza. The film won five awards at the Indonesian Film Festival in 2017, including Best Feature Film.

Accolades

References 

2010s Indonesian-language films
2016 films
2016 drama films
Indonesian drama films
Films directed by Riri Riza